The 1998 Waldbaum's Hamlet Cup was a men's tennis tournament played on Hard courts in Long Island, United that was part of the International Series of the 1998 ATP Tour. It was the eighteenth edition of the tournament and was held from 24 to 30 August 1998.

Seeds
Champion seeds are indicated in bold text while text in italics indicates the round in which those seeds were eliminated.

Draw

Finals

References

Doubles
Connecticut Open (tennis)
1998 Waldbaum's Hamlet Cup